is a Japanese animation studio founded on June 22, 1984, and based in Suginami, Tokyo, Japan. A subsidiary company called Super Techno Arts distributed many of their properties in North America. The current president of A.P.P.P., Kazufumi Nomura, got his start working at Mushi Production. Since its establishment, A.P.P.P. has contributed to the animation of a very large number of anime films and television series in collaboration with other companies. A.P.P.P. has been primarily credited for works including Project A-ko, Robot Carnival, and Roujin Z. A.P.P.P. remains active as a subcontractor for other studios.

Works

Television series
Kurogane Communication (1998–1999)
Black Heaven (1999, with AIC)
Omishi Magical Theater: Risky Safety (1999–2000)
Sci-Fi Harry (2000–2001)
Fist of the Blue Sky (2006–2007)

OVA/ONAs
Cream Lemon (1984–1987)
Project A-ko 2: Plot of the Daitokuji Financial Group (1987)
Ore no Sora Keiji-hen (1991–1992)
JoJo's Bizarre Adventure (1993–1994)
Crimson Wolf (1993)
Rance: Sabaku no Guardian (1993)
Golden Boy (1995–1996)
JoJo's Bizarre Adventure (2000–2002)
Sexy Sailor Soldiers (2003)
Kage (2004)
Fist of the North Star: Legend of Toki (2008)

Films
Project A-ko (1986)
Robot Carnival (1987)
Roujin Z (1991)
Street Fighter Alpha: Generations (2005)
JoJo's Bizarre Adventure: Phantom Blood (2007)

References

External links
 

Japanese animation studios
Mass media companies established in 1984
Japanese companies established in 1984
Animation studios in Tokyo
Suginami